Happy Birthday is a 2009 Maldivian suspense thriller film written and directed by Moomin Fuad. Produced by Yoosuf Mohamed Ali under Dark Rain Entertainment, the film stars Yoosuf Shafeeu and Niuma Mohamed in pivotal roles. Winning five Gaumee Film Awards and twelve Maldives Film Awards, the film was also screened at the Venice Film Festival.

The film narrates the story of a simple man who receives a call on his birthday informing that his wife and son have been kidnapped and is asked to get the ransom if he wants them back. Though the film received positive reviews from critics, it was a commercial failure. According to Fuad, its failure had a big impact on his career and he lost several other projects due to its financial loss.

Cast 
 Yoosuf Shafeeu as Asif
 Niuma Mohamed as Suza
 Mohamed Rasheed as Office Boss
 Ahmed Asim as Ahmed
 Ahmed Saeed as Hussain
 Fathimath Azifa as Fazla
 Ali Farooq as Bank Manager
 Ismail Nuweil as Akko
 Abdul Satthar as Father
 Nashmee Mohamed Saeed as Bank Girl

Soundtrack

Reception
The film received positive reviews from critics. Ifraz Ali from Avas called the film a "masterpiece" of Fuad in terms of writing and direction. A total of five shows with little occupancy were screened at the cinema and was crashed afterwards. Regarding its commercial failure, producer Mohamed Ali noted; "Maldivians were experiencing a wave of melodrama at the time, few to none were aware of art films".

Accolades

References

2009 films
Maldivian thriller films
Dark Rain Entertainment films
Films directed by Moomin Fuad